Tyburn was a manor (estate) in the county of Middlesex, one of two which were served by the parish of Marylebone.

The parish, probably therefore also the manor, was bounded by Roman roads to the west (modern Edgware Road) and south (modern Oxford Street), the junction of these was the site of the famous Tyburn Gallows (known colloquially as the "Tyburn Tree"), now occupied by Marble Arch. For this reason, for many centuries, the name Tyburn was synonymous with capital punishment, it having been the principal place for execution of London criminals and convicted traitors, including many religious martyrs. It was also known as 'God's Tribunal', in the 18th century. Tyburn took its name from the Tyburn Brook, a tributary of the River Westbourne. The name Tyburn, from Teo Bourne, means 'boundary stream', but Tyburn Brook should not be confused with the better known River Tyburn, which is the next tributary of the River Thames to the east of the Westbourne.

History

The manor of Tyburn, along with neighbouring Lisson was recorded in the Domesday Book of 1086,  and were together served by the parish of Marylebone, itself named after the stream, the original name of the parish was simply Marybourne, the stream of St Mary; the French "le" appeared in the 17th century, under the influence of names like Mary-le-Bow. Domesday showed that the manor was held, both before and after the Norman Conquest, by the Barking Abbey nunnery. The Domesday survey records it as having eight households, suggesting a population of 40. In the 1230s and 1240s, the manor was held by Gilbert de Sandford, the son of John de Sandford, who had been the chamberlain to Eleanor of Aquitaine. In 1236, the city of London contracted with Sir Gilbert to draw water from Tyburn Springs, which he held, to serve as the source of the first piped water supply for the city. The water was supplied in lead pipes that ran from where Bond Street Station stands today, 800 m east of Hyde Park, down to the hamlet of Charing (Charing Cross), along Fleet Street and over the Fleet Bridge, climbing Ludgate Hill (by gravitational pressure) to a public conduit at Cheapside. Water was supplied free to all comers.

The junction of the two Roman Roads had significance from ancient times and was marked by a monument known as Oswulf's Stone, which gave its name to the Ossulstone Hundred of Middlesex. The stone was covered over in 1851 when Marble Arch was moved to the area, but it was shortly afterwards unearthed and propped up against the Arch. It has not been seen since it was stolen in 1869.

Tyburn gallows

Although executions took place elsewhere (notably on Tower Hill, generally related to treason by gentlemen), the Roman road junction at Tyburn became associated with the place of criminal execution after most were moved here from Smithfield in the 1400s. Prisoners were taken in public procession from Newgate Prison in the City, via St Giles in the Fields and Oxford Street (then known as Tyburn Road).  From the late 18th century, when public executions were no longer carried out at Tyburn, they occurred at Newgate Prison itself and at Horsemonger Lane Gaol in Southwark.

The first recorded execution took place at a site next to the stream in 1196. William Fitz Osbert, populist leader who played a major role in an 1196 popular revolt in London, was cornered in the church of St Mary-le-Bow. He was dragged naked behind a horse to Tyburn, where he was hanged.

In 1537, Henry VIII used Tyburn to execute the ringleaders of the Pilgrimage of Grace, including Sir Nicholas Tempest, one of the northern leaders of the Pilgrimage and the King's own Bowbearer of the Forest of Bowland.

In 1571, the Tyburn Tree was erected near the junction of today's Edgware Road, Bayswater Road and Oxford Street, 200 m west of Marble Arch. The "Tree" or "Triple Tree" was a form of gallows, consisting of a horizontal wooden triangle supported by three legs (an arrangement known as a "three-legged mare" or "three-legged stool"). Multiple criminals could be hanged at once, and so the gallows were used for mass executions, such as on 23 June 1649 when 24 prisoners (23 men and 1 woman) were hanged simultaneously, having been conveyed there in eight carts.

After executions, the bodies would be buried nearby or in later times removed for dissection by anatomists. The crowd would sometimes fight over a body with surgeons, for fear that dismemberment could prevent the resurrection of the body on Judgement Day (see Jack Sheppard, Dick Turpin or William Spiggot).

The first victim of the "Tyburn Tree" was John Story, a Roman Catholic who was convicted and tried for treason. A plaque to the Catholic martyrs executed at Tyburn in the period 1535–1681 is located at 8 Hyde Park Place, the site of Tyburn convent. Among the more notable individuals suspended from the "Tree" in the following centuries were John Bradshaw, Henry Ireton and Oliver Cromwell, who were already dead but were disinterred and hanged at Tyburn in January 1661 on the orders of the Cavalier Parliament in an act of posthumous revenge for their part in the beheading of King Charles I.

The gallows seem to have been replaced several times, probably because of wear, but in general, the entire structure stood all the time in Tyburn. After some acts of vandalism, in October 1759 it was decided to replace the permanent structure with new moving gallows until the last execution in Tyburn, probably carried out in November 1783.

The executions were public spectacles which attracted crowds of thousands.  Spectator stands provided deluxe views for a fee. On one occasion, the stands collapsed, reportedly killing and injuring hundreds of people. One such event was depicted by William Hogarth in his satirical print The Idle 'Prentice Executed at Tyburn (1747).

Tyburn was commonly invoked in euphemisms for capital punishment—for instance, to "take a ride to Tyburn" (or simply "go west") was to go to one's hanging, "Lord of the Manor of Tyburn" was the public hangman, "dancing the Tyburn jig" was the act of being hanged. Convicts would be transported to the site in an open ox-cart from Newgate Prison. They were expected to put on a good show, wearing their finest clothes and going to their deaths with insouciance.

On 19 April 1779, clergyman James Hackman was hanged there following his 7 April murder of courtesan and socialite Martha Ray, the mistress of John Montagu, 4th Earl of Sandwich. The Tyburn gallows were last used on 3 November 1783, when John Austin, a highwayman, was hanged; for the next eighty-five years hangings were staged outside Newgate prison. Then, in 1868, due to public disorder during these public executions, it was decided to execute the convicts inside the prison.

The site of the gallows is now marked by three young oak trees that were planted in 2014 on an island in the middle of Edgware Road at its junction with Bayswater Road. Between the trees is a roundel with the inscription "The site of Tyburn Tree". It is also commemorated by the Tyburn Convent, a Catholic convent dedicated to the memory of martyrs executed there and in other locations for the Catholic faith.

Although most historical records and modern science agree that the Tyburn gallows were situated where Oxford Street meets Edgware Road and Bayswater Road, in the January 1850 issue of Notes and Queries, the book collector and musicologist Edward Francis Rimbault published a list of faults he had found in Peter Cunningham's 1849 Handbook of London, in which he claimed that the correct site of the gallows is where 49 Connaught Square later was built, stating that "in the lease granted by the Bishop of London, this is particularly mentioned".

Process of executions 
Tyburn was primarily known for its gallows, which functioned as the main execution site for London-area prisoners from the 16th through to the 18th centuries. For those people found guilty of capital crimes who could not get a pardon, which accounted for approximately 40%, a probable destiny was to be hanged at Tyburn. Other contemporary methods of punishment that may have been used as alternatives to Tyburn included execution, followed by being hung in chains, where the crime was committed; or burning at the stake; and being drawn and quartered, of which the latter two were common in cases of treason.

The last days of the condemned were marked by religious events. On the Sunday before every execution, a sermon was preached in Newgate's chapel, which those unaffiliated with the execution could pay to attend. Furthermore, the night before the execution, around midnight, the sexton of St Sepulchre's church, adjacent to Newgate, recited verses outside the wall of the condemned. The following morning, the convicts heard prayers and, those who wished to do so, received the sacrament.

On the day of execution, the condemned were transported to the Tyburn gallows from Newgate in a horse-drawn open cart. A usual stop of the cart was at the Bowl Inn in St Giles, where the condemned were allowed to drink strong liquors or wine.

Having arrived at Tyburn, the condemned found themselves in front of a crowded and noisy square; the wealthy paid to sit on the stands erected for the occasion, in order to have an unobstructed view. Before the execution, the condemned were allowed to say a few words—the authorities expected that most of the condemned, before their death, before commending their own souls to God, would admit their guilt. It is reported that the majority of the condemned did so. A noose was then placed around their neck and the cart pulled away, leaving them hanging.

Instances of pickpocketing have been reported in the crowds of executions, a mockery of the deterrent effect of capital punishment, which at the time was considered proper punishment for theft.

Social aspects 
Sites of public executions were significant gathering places and executions were public spectacles. Scholars have described the executions at Tyburn as "carnivalesque occasion[s] in which the normative message intended by the authorities is reappropriated and inverted by an irreverent crowd" that found them a source of "entertainment as well as conflict." This analysis is supported by the presence of shouting street traders and food vendors and the erection of seating for wealthier onlookers. Additionally, a popular belief held that the hand of an executed criminal could cure cancers, and it was not uncommon to see mothers brushing their child's cheek with the hand of the condemned. The gallows at Tyburn were sources of cadavers for surgeons and anatomists.

Executioners

 "The hangman of London " Cratwell  – 1 September 1538
 Thomas Derrick 
 Gregory Brandon 1625 (or earlier) – ?, after whom the phrase the "Gregorian tree" was coined.
 Robert Brandon – 1649 "Young Gregory" alongside his father at least part of the period.
 Edward Dun
 Jack Ketch 1663 – early 1686, reinstated briefly in late 1686
 Paskah Rose 1686 – 28 May 1686
 Richard Pearse (?) 1686–?
 Unknown or unknowns
 John Price 1714–16
 William Marvell 1716 – November 1717
 John Price 1717–18
 William Marvell (?) 1718
 Bailiff Banks ?–1719
 Richard Arnet 1719 – 
 John Hooper ? – March 1735
 John Thrift March 1735 – May 1752
 Thomas Turlis 1754–1771
 Edward Dennis 1771 – 21 November 1786

Notable executions

See also
 Thomas Derrick an executioner at Tyburn.
 Carthusian Martyrs of London
 Last dying speeches
 Ordinary of Newgate's Account

Notes

References

External links

 Connected Histories
 

Areas of London
Execution sites in England
History of the City of Westminster
London crime history